Kempioconcha conradti is a species of small air-breathing land snail, a terrestrial pulmonate gastropod mollusk in the family  Achatinidae. This species is endemic to Tanzania.

References

Endemic fauna of Tanzania
Fauna of Tanzania
Achatinidae
Taxonomy articles created by Polbot
Taxobox binomials not recognized by IUCN